The Moose Jaw station is a former railway station in Moose Jaw, Saskatchewan, Canada. It was designed by John Schoefield, and built by the Canadian National Railway in 1919. The station, consisting of a two-storey central block with single-storey wings to the north and south, is constructed primarily of Claybank brick and Tyndall stone.
The building was designated a historic railway station in 1992, and a municipal heritage property by the City of Moose Jaw on 8 April 2002. Its exterior has been restored and its interior extensively renovated by its current occupant, Sahara Spa, which operates a destination day spa in the building.

References 

Designated Heritage Railway Stations in Saskatchewan
Canadian National Railway stations in Saskatchewan
Railway stations in Canada opened in 1919
Disused railway stations in Canada
Buildings and structures in Moose Jaw
Transport in Moose Jaw
1919 establishments in Saskatchewan